James Anthony Davis Borikó (born 5 July 1995), also known simply as James, is a Spanish-born Equatoguinean professional footballer who plays for Spanish club Llosetense and the Equatorial Guinea national team. Mainly a winger, he can also appear as a left back.

Club career
Born in Palma, Majorca, Balearic Islands, James joined RCD Mallorca's youth setup in 2011, aged 16, from CD Atlético Baleares. He was also called up to train with the main squad two times, one in October 2012 under Joaquín Caparrós, and other in February 2013 under Gregorio Manzano.

In the 2014 summer James was promoted to the reserves in Segunda División B. He made his senior debut on 24 August, coming on as a second-half substitute in a 2–1 home win against Valencia CF Mestalla.

James made his professional debut on 21 November 2015, coming on as a half-time substitute for Thierry Moutinho in a 1–1 home draw against CD Lugo in the Segunda División. On 24 June of the following year, he signed a new two-year deal with the club, but remained assigned to the B-side.

On 22 August 2018, James was loaned to third division side CD Guijuelo, for one year.

International career
A son of a Fernandino father and a Bubi mother, James was eligible for Equatorial Guinea despite being born in Spain. On 26 March 2015 he made his full international debut, starting in a 0–2 friendly loss against Egypt.

Career statistics

International

References

External links

1995 births
Living people
Citizens of Equatorial Guinea through descent
Equatoguinean footballers
Association football wingers
Association football fullbacks
Association football utility players
Equatorial Guinea international footballers
Segunda División B players
Tercera División players
Segunda División players
Football League (Greece) players
RCD Mallorca B players
RCD Mallorca players
CD Guijuelo footballers
Iraklis Thessaloniki F.C. players
Equatoguinean expatriate footballers
Equatoguinean expatriate sportspeople in Greece
Expatriate footballers in Greece
People of Bubi descent
People of Liberated African descent
Footballers from Palma de Mallorca
Spanish footballers
Spanish expatriate footballers
Spanish expatriate sportspeople in Greece
Spanish sportspeople of Equatoguinean descent
Spanish people of Bubi descent
21st-century African-American people
CE Andratx footballers